This article is a list of historic places in the City of Kingston, Ontario entered on the Canadian Register of Historic Places, whether they are federal, provincial, or municipal.

See also List of historic places in Ontario.

List of historic places

See also
List of National Historic Sites of Canada in Kingston, Ontario

References

Kingston
Culture of Kingston, Ontario
 List of sites